An anorectic or anorexic is a drug which reduces appetite, resulting in lower food consumption, leading to weight loss. By contrast, an appetite stimulant is referred to as orexigenic.

The term is (from the Greek ἀν- (an-) = "without" and ὄρεξις (órexis) = "appetite"), and such drugs are also known as anorexigenic, anorexiant, or appetite suppressant.

History
Used on a short-term basis clinically to treat obesity, some appetite suppressants are also available over-the-counter. Most common natural appetite suppressants are based on Hoodia, a genus of 13 species in the flowering plant family Apocynaceae, under the subfamily Asclepiadoideae. Several appetite suppressants are based on a mix of natural ingredients, mostly using green tea as its basis, in combination with other plant extracts such as fucoxanthin, found naturally in seaweed. Drugs of this class are frequently stimulants of the phenethylamine family, related to amphetamine.

The German and Finnish militaries issued amphetamines (Pervitin) to soldiers commonly to enhance warfare during the Second World War. Similarly, the UK military was supplied with more than 72 million Benzedrine tablets and the US military with an approximately equal amount for situations, in which fatigue was not deemed to be an acceptable option. Following the war, large amphetamine surpluses where redirected for use on the black and the civilian market. Indeed, amphetamine itself was sold commercially as an appetite suppressant until it was outlawed in most parts of the world in the late 1950s because of safety issues. Many amphetamines produce side effects, including addiction, tachycardia and hypertension, making prolonged unsupervised use dangerous.

Public health concerns
Epidemics of fatal pulmonary hypertension and heart valve damage associated with pharmaceutical anorectic agents have led to the withdrawal of products from the market. This was the case with aminorex in the 1960s, and again in the 1990s with fenfluramine (see: Fen-phen). Likewise, association of the related appetite suppressant phenylpropanolamine with hemorrhagic stroke led the Food and Drug Administration (FDA) to request its withdrawal from the market in the United States in 2000, and similar concerns regarding ephedrine resulted in an FDA ban on its inclusion in dietary supplements in 2004.  A Federal judge later overturned this ban in 2005 during a challenge by supplement maker Nutraceuticals. It is also debatable as to whether the ephedrine ban had more to do with its use as a precursor in methamphetamine manufacture rather than health concerns with the ingredient as such.

Non-pharmacological alternatives
Weight loss effects of water have been subject to some scientific research as a potential non-pharmacological approach. Drinking water prior to each meal may help in appetite suppression. Consumption of 500 mL (approximately 17 fl oz) of water 30 minutes before meals has been correlated with modest weight loss (1–2 kg) in obese men and women over a period of 8 to 12 weeks.

List of anorectics 
Numerous pharmaceutical compounds are marketed as appetite suppressants.

The following drugs are listed as "centrally-acting antiobesity preparations" in the Anatomical Therapeutic Chemical Classification System:
 Amfepramone (also known as diethylpropion)
 Bupropion and naltrexone (combination)
 Cathine
 Clobenzorex
 Dexfenfluramine† (the D-enantiomer of fenfluramine; withdrawn for the same reason as its racemate)
 Ephedrine (combinations) 
 Etilamfetamine 
 Fenfluramine† (one of the two components [the other being phentermine] of Fen-phen. Since discontinued to its potential for causing valvulopathies and pulmonary hypertension)
 Lorcaserin (withdrawn in the United States by the FDA due to an increased risk of cancer)
 Mazindol
 Mefenorex
 Phentermine
 Sibutramine† (in some countries withdrawn from the market because of concerns regarding its cardiovascular effects)
 Topiramate

The following are listed as appetite depressants by MeSH, an index of medical journal articles and books.
 Benfluorex (removed from the market by the EMA due to increased risk of heart disease)
 Butenolide
 Diethylpropion
 FG-7142
 Phenmetrazine† (withdrawn in some countries due to the danger of addiction)
 Phentermine
 Phenylpropanolamine
 Pyroglutamyl-histidyl-glycine
 Sibutramine

Other compounds with known appetite suppressant activity include:
 Amphetamine-Dextroamphetamine is known to hamper appetite. Amphetamine-Dextroamphetamine is used to treat Attention deficit hyperactivity disorder (ADHD) and is usually under the trade name "Adderall" or "Mydayis".
 Amphetamine sulfate (also known as amfetamine) – US FDA-approved for the treatment of exogenous obesity under the brand name "Evekeo".
 Methylphenidate
 Cocaine
 Caffeine
 Glucomannan
 Leptin
 Methamphetamine hydrochloride – USFDA-approved for the treatment of obesity (as a short-term) under the brand name "Desoxyn".
 Nicotine
 Liraglutide as brand name Saxenda
 Semaglutide (brand name Ozempic/Wegovy) GLP-1 agonist
 Opiates/opioids such as heroin, morphine, codeine, oxycodone, fentanyl, etc.

See also
 Anti-obesity medication

References

External links